Horse Cave is a home rule-class city in Hart County, Kentucky, United States. Randall Curry currently serves as mayor of the city and is assisted by a city council that is composed of six members. As of the 2010 census, the population of Horse Cave was 2,311, making it the most populous community in the county.

History
The town was settled by Major Albert Anderson in the 1840s. The landowner donated land for a Louisville and Nashville Railroad station in 1858 on the provision that it be named after nearby Horse Cave. The community around the station developed quickly, so that a post office was erected in 1860, and the city was formally incorporated by the state assembly in 1864.

The cave for which the city is named is located on the south side of Main Street. Various explanations are given for its unusual name. One is that Native Americans or outlaws hid horses in the cave; another is that an early carriage may have lost a horse when it fell into the opening by accident; a third reason involves the 19th-century use of "horse" as slang for anything big or huge, related to a similar use of the Swedish hoss. The cave has also been known as "Hidden River Cave", for an underground stream located inside. That stream was used to power a dynamo, and for a while in the late 19th century Horse Cave was the only city in Kentucky apart from Louisville and Ashland to have electric lights. Around World War I, the only air-conditioned tennis courts in the world were located near the entrance of the cave. The stream also provided the town's water supply, but mistaken development caused raw sewage to seep into the water and forced the closure of the cave for fifty years. The stench was so bad in the 1960s that pedestrians typically crossed to the other side of Main Street rather than walk near the entrance and birds would sometimes fall from the sky. The problem has been largely solved in recent years.

The town changed its name to "Caverna" in 1869 but the inability to change the name of the railroad station prompted the community to reconsider and restore the name "Horse Cave" in 1879. Owing to its early rail connection, Horse Cave was a major center of agricultural commerce for Hart, Metcalfe, Green, and Barren counties since the 1870s. Tobacco warehouses provided the majority of the income.

Since the 1970s, some factories have relocated to the area, including Dart Container Corporation, T Marzetti Company, and Sister Schubert's Bakery. Tourist attractions include Kentucky Down Under/Kentucky Caverns, Hidden River Cave/American Cave Museum, and the nearby Mammoth Cave National Park. Civil War Days are an annual tourist event, during which time parades down Main Street and reenactments of the Battle of Rowlett's Station between Horse Cave and Munfordville are staged. A local theatre formerly known as the Horse Cave Theatre and/or the Kentucky Repertory Theatre once operated in Horse Cave but is no longer in business. Horse Cave serves as filming location for several films, including "Runaway Romance"  and "Never Forgive."

Geography
Horse Cave's southern border is the Barren County line and the border of Cave City. U.S. Route 31W (Dixie Street) is the main road through Horse Cave, leading north  to Munfordville and southwest through Cave City  to Park City near the entrance to Mammoth Cave National Park. I-65 leads north  to Louisville and southwest  to Nashville, Tennessee.

Demographics

As of the census of 2000, there were 2,252 people, 977 households, and 601 families residing in the city. The racial makeup of the city was 80.91% White, 17.94% Black or African American, 0.27% Native American, 0.04% from other races, and 0.84% from two or more races. 0.58% of the population were Hispanic or Latino of any race.

There were 977 households, out of which 28.0% had children under the age of 18 living with them, 40.2% were married couples living together, 18.2% had a female householder with no husband present, and 38.4% were non-families. 34.8% of all households were made up of individuals, and 16.8% had someone living alone who was 65 years of age or older. The average household size was 2.21 and the average family size was 2.84.

In the city, the population was spread out, with 21.8% under the age of 18, 8.8% from 18 to 24, 26.4% from 25 to 44, 22.6% from 45 to 64, and 20.3% who were 65 years of age or older. The median age was 40 years. For every 100 females, there were 81.8 males. For every 100 females age 18 and over, there were 72.5 males.

The median income for a household in the city was $21,134, and the median income for a family was $28,026. Males had a median income of $25,905 versus $18,457 for females. The per capita income for the city was $17,861. About 24.1% of families and 27.9% of the population were below the poverty line, including 36.8% of those under age 18 and 22.5% of those age 65 or over.

Arts and culture
Horse Cave has a library, the Horse Cave Public Library.

Notable people
Simon Bolivar Buckner, 30th governor of Kentucky
Clarence Glover, former NBA player
Tom Moran, National Football League player
John Stanley Palmore, Jr., former Chief Justice of Kentucky's Supreme Court

See also
 List of caves in the United States

References

External links
 
 Hart County News-Herald, local newspaper
 Hidden River Cave/American Cave Museum

Cities in Kentucky
Cities in Hart County, Kentucky
Caves of Kentucky
Show caves in the United States
Landforms of Hart County, Kentucky